Daraga may refer to:

Daraga, a municipality in the province of Albay, the Philippines
USS Daraga (SP-43), a United States Navy patrol boat in commission from 1917 to 1919